Jacques Verbrugge (born 24 April 1955) is a Dutch racing cyclist. He rode in the 1979 Tour de France.

References

1955 births
Living people
Dutch male cyclists
Place of birth missing (living people)